Mars Reconnaissance Orbiter (MRO) is a spacecraft designed to search for the existence of water on Mars, as part of NASA's Mars Exploration Program. It was launched from Cape Canaveral on August 12, 2005, at 11:43 UTC and reached Mars on March 10, 2006, at 21:24 UTC. In November 2006, after six months of aerobraking, it entered its final science orbit and began its primary science phase. 

Mission objectives include observing the climate of Mars, investigating geologic forces, providing reconnaissance of future landing sites, and relaying data from surface missions back to Earth. To support these objectives, the MRO carries different scientific instruments, including three cameras, two spectrometers and a radar. As of January 23, 2023, the MRO has returned over 445 terabits of data, helped choose safe landing sites for NASA's Mars landers and discovered ice and possible flowing salty water on the surface of Mars.

The spacecraft continues to operate at Mars, far beyond its intended design life. Due to its critical role as a high-speed data-relay for ground missions, NASA intends to continue the mission as long as possible, at least through the late 2020s.

Pre-launch 
After the twin failures of the Mars Climate Orbiter and the Mars Polar Lander missions in 1999, NASA reorganized and replanned its Mars Exploration Program. In October 2000, NASA announced its reformulated Mars plans, which reduced the number of planned missions and introduced a new theme: "follow the water". The plans included a newly christened Mars Reconnaissance Orbiter to launch in 2005.

On October 3, 2001, NASA chose Lockheed Martin as the primary contractor for the spacecraft's fabrication. By the end of 2001 all of the mission's instruments were selected. There were no major setbacks during MRO's construction, and the spacecraft was shipped to John F. Kennedy Space Center on May 1, 2005, to prepare it for launch.

Mission objectives 

MRO has both scientific and "mission support" objectives. The prime science mission was designed to last from November 2006 to November 2008, and the mission support phase from November 2006 – November 2010. Both missions have been extended.

The formal science objectives of MRO are to:
 observe the present climate, particularly its atmospheric circulation and seasonal variations;
 search for signs of water, both past and present, and understand how it altered the planet's surface;
 map and characterize the geological forces that shaped the surface.

The two mission support objectives for MRO are to:
 provide data relay services from ground missions back to Earth;
 characterize the safety and feasibility of potential future landing sites and Mars rover traverses.

MRO played a key role in choosing safe landing sites for the Phoenix lander (2008), Mars Science Laboratory / Curiosity rover (2012), InSight lander (2018), and the Mars 2020 / Perseverance rover (2021).

Launch and orbital insertion 

On August 12, 2005, MRO was launched aboard an Atlas V-401 rocket from Space Launch Complex 41 at Cape Canaveral Air Force Station. The Centaur upper stage of the rocket completed its burns over a 56-minute period and placed MRO into an interplanetary transfer orbit towards Mars.

MRO cruised through interplanetary space for seven and a half months before reaching Mars. While en route, most of the scientific instruments and experiments were tested and calibrated. To ensure proper orbital insertion upon reaching Mars, four trajectory correction maneuvers were planned and a fifth emergency maneuver was discussed. However, only three trajectory correction maneuvers were necessary, which saved  of fuel that would be usable during MRO's extended mission.

The reduced pressure caused the engine thrust to be diminished by 2%, but MRO automatically compensated by extending the burn time by 33 seconds.

Completion of the orbital insertion placed the orbiter in a highly elliptical polar orbit with a period of approximately 35.5 hours.

When MRO entered orbit, it joined five other active spacecraft that were either in orbit or on the planet's surface: Mars Global Surveyor, Mars Express, 2001 Mars Odyssey, and the two Mars Exploration Rovers (Spirit and Opportunity). This set a new record for the most operational spacecraft in the immediate vicinity of Mars. Mars Global Surveyor and the rovers Spirit and Opportunity have since ceased to function. , 2001 Mars Odyssey, Mars Express and MRO remain operational and have been joined by MAVEN, ExoMars Trace Gas Orbiter, the Emirates Hope orbiter and the Chinese Tianwen-1 orbiter in orbit, and Curiosity, Perseverance, Ingenuity and Zhurong on the surface, a total of eleven active spacecraft. Two other spacecraft, Mars Orbiter Mission, and InSight, have also arrived at Mars, but have since been declared dead.

On March 30, 2006, MRO began the process of aerobraking, a three-step procedure that cuts in half the fuel needed to achieve a lower, more circular orbit with a shorter period. First, during its first five orbits of the planet (one Earth week), MRO used its thrusters to drop the periapsis of its orbit into aerobraking altitude. This altitude depends on the thickness of the atmosphere because Martian atmospheric density changes with its seasons. This was done in such a way so as to not heat the spacecraft too much, but also dip enough into the atmosphere to slow the spacecraft down. After the process was complete, MRO used its thrusters to move its periapsis out of the edge of the Martian atmosphere on August 30, 2006.

The SHARAD radar antennas were deployed on September 16. All of the scientific instruments were tested and most were turned off prior to the solar conjunction that occurred from October 7 to November 6, 2006. After the conjunction ended the "primary science phase" began.

Timeline 

On September 29, 2006 (sol ), MRO took its first high resolution image from its science orbit. This image is said to resolve items as small as 90 cm (3 feet) in diameter. On October 6, NASA released detailed pictures from the MRO of Victoria crater along with the Opportunity rover on the rim above it. In November, problems began to surface in the operation of two MRO spacecraft instruments. A stepping mechanism in the Mars Climate Sounder (MCS) skipped on multiple occasions resulting in a field of view that is slightly out of position. By December, normal operations of the instrument was suspended, although a mitigation strategy allows the instrument to continue making most of its intended observations. Also, an increase in noise and resulting bad pixels has been observed in several CCDs of the High Resolution Imaging Science Experiment (HiRISE). Operation of this camera with a longer warm-up time has alleviated the issue. However, the cause is still unknown and may return.

On November 17, 2006, NASA announced the successful test of the MRO as an orbital communications relay. Using the NASA rover Spirit as the point of origin for the transmission, the MRO acted as a relay for transmitting data back to Earth.

HiRISE continues to return images that have enabled discoveries regarding the geology of Mars. Foremost among these is the announcement of banded terrain observations indicating the presence and action of liquid carbon dioxide (CO2) or water on the surface of Mars in its recent geological past. HiRISE was able to photograph the Phoenix lander during its parachuted descent to Vastitas Borealis on May 25, 2008 (sol ).

The orbiter continued to experience recurring problems in 2009, including four spontaneous resets, culminating in a four-month shut-down of the spacecraft from August to December. While engineers have not determined the cause of the recurrent resets, they have created new software to help troubleshoot the problem should it recur. Another spontaneous reset occurred in September 2010.

On March 3, 2010, the Mars Reconnaissance Orbiter passed another significant milestone, having transmitted over 100 terabits of data back to Earth, which was more than all other interplanetary probes sent from Earth combined.

In December 2010, the Extended Mission began. Goals include exploring seasonal processes, searching for surface changes, and providing support for other Martian spacecraft. This lasted until October 2012, after which NASA started the MRO's second Extended Mission, which lasted until October 2014.

On August 6, 2012 (sol ), the orbiter passed over Gale crater, the landing site of the Mars Science Laboratory mission, during its EDL phase. It captured an image via the HiRISE camera of the Curiosity Rover descending with its backshell and supersonic parachute. In December 2014 and April 2015, Curiosity was photographed again by HiRISE inside Gale Crater.

Another computer anomaly occurred on March 9, 2014, when the MRO put itself into safe mode after an unscheduled swap from one computer to another. The MRO resumed normal science operations four days later. This occurred again in April 11, 2015, after which the MRO returned to full operational capabilities a week later.

NASA reported that the Mars Reconnaissance Orbiter, as well as the Mars Odyssey Orbiter and MAVEN orbiter had a chance to study the Comet Siding Spring flyby on October 19, 2014. To minimize risk of damage from the material shed by the comet, the MRO made orbital adjustments on July 2, 2014 and August 27, 2014. During the flyby, the MRO took the best ever pictures of a comet from the Oort cloud and was not damaged.

In January 2015, NASA announced that high-resolution images taken by MRO had identified the wreckage of Britain’s Beagle 2, which was lost during its landing phase in 2003, more than 11 years prior, and was thought to have crashed. The images revealed that Beagle 2 had in fact landed safely, but one or two of its solar panels had failed to fully deploy, which blocked the radio antenna. In October 2016, the crash site of another lost spacecraft, Schiaparelli EDM, was photographed by the MRO, using both the CTX and HiRISE cameras.

On July 29, 2015, the Mars Reconnaissance Orbiter was placed into a new orbit to provide communications support during the anticipated arrival of the InSight Mars lander mission in September 2016. The maneuver's engine burn lasted for 75 seconds. InSight was delayed and missed the 2016 launch window, but was successfully launched during the next window on May 5, 2018, and landed on November 26, 2018. 

In 2017, the cryocoolers used by CRISM completed its lifecycle, limiting the instrument's capabilities to visible wavelengths, instead of its full wavelength range. In 2022, NASA announced the shutdown of CRISM in its entirety.

Instruments 
Three cameras, two spectrometers and a radar are included on the orbiter along with two "science-facility instruments", which use data from engineering subsystems to collect science data. Three technology experiments will test and demonstrate new equipment for future missions. It is expected MRO will obtain about 5,000 images per year.

HiRISE (High Resolution Imaging Science Experiment) 

HiRISE collects images in three color bands, 400 to 600 nm (blue–green or B–G), 550 to 850 nm (red) and 800 to 1,000 nm (near infrared or NIR).

Red color images are 20,264 pixels across ( wide), and B–G and NIR are 4,048 pixels across ( wide). HiRISE's onboard computer reads these lines in time with the orbiter's ground speed, and images are potentially unlimited in length. Practically however, their length is limited by the computer's 28 Gigabit (Gb) memory capacity, and the nominal maximum size is 20,000 × 40,000 pixels (800 megapixels) and 4,000 × 40,000 pixels (160 megapixels) for B–G and NIR images. Each 16.4 Gb image is compressed to 5 Gb before transmission and release to the general public on the HiRISE website in JPEG 2000 format. HiRISE was built by Ball Aerospace & Technologies Corp.

CTX (Context Camera) 
CTX is designed to provide context maps for the targeted observations of HiRISE and CRISM, and is also used to mosaic large areas of Mars, monitor a number of locations for changes over time, and to acquire stereo (3D) coverage of key regions and potential future landing sites. The optics of CTX consist of a  focal length Maksutov Cassegrain telescope with a 5,064 pixel wide line array CCD. The camera was built, and is operated by Malin Space Science Systems. CTX mapped 50% of Mars by February 2010. In 2012 it found the impacts of six 55-pound (25-kilogram) entry ballast masses from Mars Science Laboratory's landing of Curiosity rover.

MARCI (Mars Color Imager) 

The Mars Color Imager (MARCI) is a wide-angle, relatively low-resolution camera that views the surface of Mars in five visible and two ultraviolet bands. This map provides a weekly weather report for Mars, helps to characterize its seasonal and annual variations, and maps the presence of water vapor and ozone in its atmosphere. The camera was built and is operated by Malin Space Science Systems. It has a 180-degree fisheye lens with the seven color filters bonded directly on a single CCD sensor. The same MARCI camera was onboard of Mars Climate Orbiter launched in 1998.

CRISM (Compact Reconnaissance Imaging Spectrometer for Mars) 

The Compact Reconnaissance Imaging Spectrometer for Mars (CRISM) instrument is a visible and near infrared spectrometer that is used to produce detailed maps of the surface mineralogy of Mars. CRISM is being used to identify minerals and chemicals indicative of the past or present existence of water on the surface of Mars. These materials include iron oxides, phyllosilicates, and carbonates, which have characteristic patterns in their visible-infrared energy. The CRISM instrument will be shut down during the 6th extended mission from 2022 to 2025, as the cryocooler was lost, forcing the shutdown of one of the two spectrometers.

MCS (Mars Climate Sounder) 

The Mars Climate Sounder (MCS) looks both down and horizontally through the atmosphere in order to quantify the global atmosphere's vertical variations. It is a spectrometer with one visible/near infrared channel (0.3 to 3.0 μm) and eight far infrared (12 to 50 μm) channels selected for the purpose. MCS observes the atmosphere on the horizon of Mars (as viewed from MRO) by breaking it up into vertical slices and taking measurements within each slice in  increments. These measurements are assembled into daily global weather maps to show the basic variables of Martian weather: temperature, pressure, humidity, and dust density.

This instrument, supplied by NASA's Jet Propulsion Laboratory, is an updated version of a heavier, larger instrument originally developed at JPL for the 1992 Mars Observer and 1998 Mars Climate Orbiter missions.

SHARAD (Shallow Subsurface Radar) 

MRO's Shallow Subsurface Radar (SHARAD) experiment is designed to probe the internal structure of the Martian polar ice caps. It also gathers planet-wide information about underground layers of ice, rock and possibly liquid water that might be accessible from the surface. SHARAD is designed to operate in conjunction with the Mars Express MARSIS, which has lower resolution but penetrates to a much greater depth. Both SHARAD and MARSIS were made by the Italian Space Agency.

Engineering instruments 
In addition to its imaging equipment, MRO carries a variety of engineering instruments. The Gravity Field Investigation Package measures variations in the Martian gravitational field through variations in the spacecraft's velocity. Velocity changes are detected by measuring doppler shifts in MRO's radio signals received on Earth. The package also includes sensitive onboard accelerometers used to deduce the in situ atmospheric density of Mars during aerobraking.

The Electra communications package is a UHF software-defined radio (SDR) that provides a flexible platform for evolving relay capabilities. It is designed to communicate with other spacecraft as they approach, land, and operate on Mars. In addition to protocol controlled inter-spacecraft data links of 1 kbit/s to 2 Mbit/s, Electra also provides Doppler data collection, open loop recording and a highly accurate timing service based on an ultra-stable oscillator. Doppler information for approaching vehicles can be used for final descent targeting or descent and landing trajectory recreation. Doppler information on landed vehicles will also enable scientists to accurately determine the surface location of Mars landers and rovers. The two Mars Exploration Rover spacecraft on Mars utilized an earlier generation UHF relay radio providing similar functions through the Mars Odyssey orbiter. The Electra radio has proven its functionality by relaying information to and from the MER spacecraft, Phoenix Mars lander and Curiosity Rover.

The Optical Navigation Camera images the Martian moons, Phobos and Deimos, against background stars to precisely determine MRO's orbit. Although moon imaging is not mission critical, it was included as a technology test for future orbiting and landing of spacecraft. The Optical Navigation Camera was tested successfully in February and March 2006. There is a proposal to search for small moons, dust rings, and old orbiters with it.

Engineering data

Structure 
Workers at Lockheed Martin Space Systems in Denver assembled the spacecraft structure and attached the instruments. Instruments were constructed at the Jet Propulsion Laboratory, the University of Arizona Lunar and Planetary Laboratory in Tucson, Arizona, Johns Hopkins University Applied Physics Laboratory in Laurel, Maryland, the Italian Space Agency in Rome, and Malin Space Science Systems in San Diego.

The structure is made of mostly carbon composites and aluminum-honeycombed plates. The titanium fuel tank takes up most of the volume and mass of the spacecraft and provides most of its structural integrity.

Power systems 

MRO gets all of its electrical power from two solar panels, each of which can move independently around two axes (up-down, or left-right rotation). Each solar panel measures  and has  covered with 3,744 individual photovoltaic cells. Its high-efficiency solar cells are able to convert more than 26% of the Sun's energy directly into electricity and are connected together to produce a total output of 32 volts. At Mars, the panels produce more than 1,000 watts of power; in contrast, the panels would generate 3,000 watts in a comparable Earth orbit by being closer to the Sun.

MRO has two rechargeable nickel-hydrogen batteries used to power the spacecraft when it is not facing the Sun. Each battery has an energy storage capacity of 50 ampere hours (180 kC). The full range of the batteries cannot be used due to voltage constraints on the spacecraft, but allows the operators to extend the battery life—a valuable capability, given that battery drain is one of the most common causes of long-term satellite failure. Planners anticipate that only 40% of the batteries' capacities will be required during the lifetime of the spacecraft.

Electronic systems 
MRO's main computer is a 133 MHz, 10.4 million transistor, 32-bit, RAD750 processor. This processor is a radiation-hardened version of a PowerPC 750 or G3 processor with a specially built motherboard. The RAD750 is a successor to the RAD6000. This processor may seem underpowered in comparison to a modern PC processor, but it is extremely reliable, resilient, and can function in solar flare-ravaged deep space. The operating system software is VxWorks and has extensive fault protection protocols and monitoring.

Data is stored in a 160 Gb (20 GB) flash memory module consisting of over 700 memory chips, each with a 256 Mbit capacity. This memory capacity is not actually that large considering the amount of data to be acquired; for example, a single image from the HiRISE camera can be as large as 28 Gb.

Telecommunications system 

The Telecom Subsystem on MRO is the best digital communication system sent into deep space so far, and for the first time used capacity-approaching turbo-codes. The Electra communications package is a UHF software-defined radio (SDR) that provides a flexible platform for evolving relay capabilities. It is designed to communicate with other spacecraft as they approach, land, and operate on Mars. Maximum transmission speed from Mars is projected to be as high as 6 Mbit/s, a rate ten times higher than previous Mars orbiters. The spacecraft carries two 100-watt X-band Travelling Wave Tube Amplifiers (TWTA) (one of which is a backup), one 35-watt Ka-band amplifier, and two Small Deep Space Transponders (SDSTs).

Two smaller low-gain antennas are also present for lower-rate communication during emergencies and special events, such as launch and Mars Orbit Insertion. These antennas do not have focusing dishes and can transmit and receive from any direction. They are an important backup system to ensure that MRO can always be reached, even if its main antenna is pointed away from the Earth.

The Ka-band subsystem was used for demonstration purposes. Due to lack of spectrum at 8.41 GHz X-band, future high-rate deep space missions will use 32 GHz Ka-band. NASA Deep Space Network (DSN) implemented Ka-band receiving capabilities at all three of its complexes (Goldstone, Canberra and Madrid) over its 34-m beam-waveguide (BWG) antenna subnet. Ka-band tests were also planned during the science phase, but during aerobraking a switch failed, limiting the X-band high gain antenna to a single amplifier. If this amplifier fails all high-speed X-band communications will be lost. The Ka downlink is the only remaining backup for this functionality, and since the Ka-band capability of one of the SDST transponders has already failed, (and the other might have the same problem) JPL decided to halt all Ka-band demonstrations and hold the remaining capability in reserve.

By November 2013, the MRO had passed 200 terabits in the amount of science data returned. The data returned by the mission is more than three times the total data returned via NASA's Deep Space Network for all the other missions managed by NASA's Jet Propulsion Laboratory over the past 10 years.

Propulsion and attitude control 
Fuel pressure is regulated by adding pressurized helium gas from an external tank. Seventy percent of the propellant was used for orbital insertion, and it has enough propellant to keep functioning into the 2030s.

MRO has twenty rocket engine thrusters on board. Six large thrusters each produce  of thrust for a total of  meant mainly for orbital insertion. These thrusters were originally designed for the Mars Surveyor 2001 Lander. Six medium thrusters each produce  of thrust for trajectory correction maneuvers and attitude control during orbit insertion. Finally, eight small thrusters each produce  of thrust for attitude control during normal operations.

Four reaction wheels are also used for precise attitude control during activities requiring a highly stable platform, such as high-resolution imaging, in which even small motions can cause blurring of the image. Each wheel is used for one axis of motion. The fourth (skewed) wheel is a backup in case one of the other three wheels fails. Each wheel weighs  and can be spun as fast as 100 Hz or 6,000 rpm.

In order to determine the spacecraft's orbit and facilitate maneuvers, sixteen Sun sensors – eight primaries and eight backups – are placed around the spacecraft to calibrate solar direction relative to the orbiter's frame. Two star trackers, digital cameras used to map the position of catalogued stars, provide NASA with full, three-axis knowledge of the spacecraft orientation and attitude. A primary and backup Miniature Inertial Measurement Unit (MIMU), provided by Honeywell, measures changes to the spacecraft attitude as well as any non-gravitationally induced changes to its linear velocity. Each MIMU is a combination of three accelerometers and three ring-laser gyroscopes. These systems are all critically important to MRO, as it must be able to point its camera to a very high precision in order to take the high-quality pictures that the mission requires. It has also been specifically designed to minimize any vibrations on the spacecraft, so as to allow its instruments to take images without any distortions caused by vibrations.

Cost 

Discoveries

Water ice in ice cap measured 

Ice exposed in new craters 
An article in the journal Science in September 2009, reported that some new craters on Mars have excavated relatively pure water ice. After being exposed, the ice gradually fades as it sublimates away. These new craters were found and dated by the CTX camera, and the identification of the ice was confirmed with the Compact Imaging Spectrometer (CRISM) on board the Mars Reconnaissance Orbiter. The ice was found in a total of five locations. Three of the locations are in the Cebrenia quadrangle.

Ice in lobate debris aprons 

Radar results from SHARAD suggested that features termed lobate debris aprons (LDAs) contain large amounts of water ice. Of interest from the days of the Viking Orbiters, these LDA are aprons of material surrounding cliffs. They have a convex topography and a gentle slope; this suggests flow away from the steep source cliff. In addition, lobate debris aprons can show surface lineations just as rock glaciers on the Earth. SHARAD has provided strong evidence that the LDAs in Hellas Planitia are glaciers that are covered with a thin layer of debris (i.e. rocks and dust); a strong reflection from the top and base of LDAs was observed, suggesting that pure water ice makes up the bulk of the formation (between the two reflections). Based on the experiments of the Phoenix lander and the studies of the Mars Odyssey from orbit, water ice is known to exist just under the surface of Mars in the far north and south (high latitudes).

Chloride deposits 

Using data from Mars Global Surveyor, Mars Odyssey, and the Mars Reconnaissance Orbiter, scientists have found widespread deposits of chloride minerals. Evidence suggests that the deposits were formed from the evaporation of mineral enriched waters. The research suggests that lakes may have been scattered over large areas of the Martian surface. Usually chlorides are the last minerals to come out of solution. Carbonates, sulfates, and silica should precipitate out ahead of them. Sulfates and silica have been found by the Mars rovers on the surface. Places with chloride minerals may have once held various life forms. Furthermore, such areas could preserve traces of ancient life.

Other Aqueous Minerals
In 2009, a group of scientists from the CRISM team reported on nine to ten different classes of minerals formed in the presence of water. Different types of clays (also called phyllosilicates) were found in many locations. The phyllosilicates identified included aluminum smectite, iron/magnesium smectite, kaolinite, prehnite, and chlorite. Rocks containing carbonate were found around the Isidis basin. Carbonates belong to one class in which life could have developed. Areas around Valles Marineris were found to contain hydrated silica and hydrated sulfates. The researchers identified hydrated sulfates and ferric minerals in Terra Meridiani and in Valles Marineris. Other minerals found on Mars were jarosite, alunite, hematite, opal, and gypsum. Two to five of the mineral classes were formed with the right pH and sufficient water to permit life to grow.

Flowing salty water 
On August 4, 2011 (sol ), NASA announced that MRO had detected what appeared to be flowing salty water on the surface or subsurface of Mars. On September 28, 2015, this finding was confirmed at a special NASA news conference.

Gallery

Avalanches 
The Mars Reconnaissance Orbiter CTX and HiRISE cameras have photographed a number of avalanches off the scarps of the northern polar cap as they were occurring.

Other spacecraft

See also

References

Further reading

External links

General
 NASA's Mars Reconnaissance Orbiter page
 MRO Mars Arrival Press Kit (2006)

Official instrument websites
 HiRISE Website
 CTX Website
 MARCI Website
 SHARAD Website
 CRISM Website

Images
 HiRISE Image Catalog
 Mars Reconnaissance Orbiter images at the JPL Photojournal
 Multimedia gallery by Kevin Gill based on HiRISE photos

 
Mars Exploration Program
Reconnaissance
Mars Reconnaissance
Reconnaissance
Mars Reconnaissance
Mars Reconnaissance
Spacecraft launched by Atlas rockets
2005 in Florida